In Norse mythology, Ratatoskr (Old Norse, generally considered to mean "drill-tooth" or "bore-tooth") is a squirrel who runs up and down the world tree Yggdrasil to carry messages between the eagles perched atop Yggdrasil, and the serpent Níðhöggr, who dwells beneath one of the three roots of the tree. Ratatoskr is attested in the Poetic Edda, compiled in the 13th century from earlier traditional sources, and the Prose Edda,  written in the 13th century by Snorri Sturluson.

Etymology
The name Ratatoskr contains two elements: rata- and -toskr. The element toskr is generally held to mean "tusk". Guðbrandur Vigfússon theorized that the rati- element means "the traveller". He says that the name of the legendary drill Rati may feature the same term. According to Vigfússon, Ratatoskr means "tusk the traveller" or "the climber tusk."

Sophus Bugge theorized that the name Ratatoskr is a loanword from Old English meaning "Rat-tooth." Bugge's basis hinges on the fact that the -toskr element of the compound does not appear anywhere else in Old Norse. Bugge proposed that the -toskr element is a reformation of the Old English word tūsc (Old Frisian tusk) and, in turn, that the element Rata- represents Old English ræt ("rat").

According to Albert Sturtevant, "[as] far as the element Rata- is concerned, Bugge's hypothesis has no valid foundation in view of the fact that the [Old Norse] word Rata (gen. form of Rati*) is used in Háv[amál] (106, 1) to signify the instrument which Odin employed for boring his way through the rocks in quest of the poet's mead [...]" and that "Rati* must then be considered a native [Old Norse] word meaning "The Borer, Gnawer" [...]".

Sturtevant says that Bugge's theory regarding the element -toskr may appear to be supported by the fact that the word does not appear elsewhere in Old Norse. However, Sturtevant says that the Old Norse proper name Tunne (derived from Proto-Norse *Tunþē) refers to "a person who is characterized as having some peculiar sort of tooth" and theorizes a Proto-Germanic form of -toskr. Sturtevant concludes that "the fact that the [Old Norse] word occurs only in the name Rata-toskr is no valid evidence against this assumption, for there are many [Old Norse] hapax legomena of native origin, as is attested by the equivalents in the Mod[ern] Scandinavian dialects." Modern scholars have accepted this etymology, listing the name Ratatoskr as meaning "drill-tooth" (Jesse Byock, Andy Orchard, Rudolf Simek) or "bore-tooth" (John Lindow).

Attestations

In the Poetic Edda poem Grímnismál, the god Odin (disguised as Grímnir) says that Ratatoskr runs up and down Yggdrasil bringing messages between the eagle perched atop it and Níðhöggr below it:

Ratatoskr is described in the Prose Eddas Gylfaginning chapter 16, in which High states that

An eagle sits at the top of the ash, and it has knowledge of many things. Between its eyes sits the hawk called Vedrfolnir [...]. The squirrel called Ratatosk [...] runs up and down the ash. He tells slanderous gossip, provoking the eagle and Nidhogg.

Theories
According to Rudolf Simek, "the squirrel probably only represents an embellishing detail to the mythological picture of the world-ash in Grímnismál. Hilda Ellis Davidson, describing the world tree, states the squirrel is said to gnaw at it—furthering a continual destruction and re-growth cycle, and posits the tree symbolizes ever-changing existence. John Lindow points out that Yggdrasil is described as rotting on one side and as being chewed on by four harts and Níðhöggr, and that, according to the account in Gylfaginning, it also bears verbal hostility in the fauna it supports. Lindow adds that "in the sagas, a person who helps stir up or keep feuds alive by ferrying words of malice between the participants is seldom one of high status, which may explain the assignment of this role in the mythology to a relatively insignificant animal".

Richard W. Thorington Jr. and Katie Ferrell theorize that "the role of Ratatosk probably derived from the habit of European tree squirrels (Sciurus vulgaris) to give a scolding alarm call in response to danger. It takes little imagination for you to think that the squirrel is saying nasty things about you."

In popular culture
Ratatoskr appears in his natural habitat in American Gods by Neil Gaiman.

A fragment of Ratatoskr, nicknamed “Bitter” and voiced by Troy Baker, appears in the 2018 video game God of War, where he has the ability to provide the player with healing items. The actual Ratatoskr appears in the 2022 sequel, God of War Ragnarök (alongside Bitter), tending to the world tree Yggdrasil; this version of the character is voiced by SungWon Cho.

He also appears as a playable character in the game Smite. 

In the 2010 video game Young Thor, Ratatoskr is depicted as an ally of Hel, who serves as the game's antagonist.

Ratatoskr also appears in the 2020 video game Assassin's Creed Valhalla, where he engages the player in flyting, a poetic duel, in the mythical realm of Jötunheimr.

In the comic book series The Unbeatable Squirrel Girl, Ratatoskr is featured as a villainous female squirrel god from Asgard who wants to destroy all of humanity. She was defeated by Squirrel Girl after she teamed up with Thor and Loki. However, she later teamed up with Squirrel Girl to fight the Frost Giants.

Ratatoskr appears in the trading card game Magic: The Gathering as 'Toski, Bearer of Secrets'; a homage to the mythical creature. The card’s effects connote Toski's tenacity to exchange information between the many realms of Kaldheim.

Ratatoskr can be cast as the spell "Ratatoskr's Spin," as of 2019, in the video game Wizard101, where he climbs down the world tree, digging up a giant acorn and damaging all enemies with it.

Ratatosk appears in the novel Hellboy: The Bones of Giants (2001) by Christopher Golden.

In the novel Hammered, Atticus rides Ratatoskr to the top of Yggdrasil on his quest to steal the golden apples of Iðunn.

Ratatosk is referenced in Larry Niven's novel Rainbow Mars. Plans were made to capture a giant squirrel that ran up and down the World Tree (Yggdrasil). Although called "Batatosk" in the story, it is clearly referring to the mythical creature Ratatosk. 

Ratatosk is the name of the Summon Spirit of Monsters in Tales of Symphonia: Dawn of the New World, though his role is quite a bit different from Norse myth.  He is responsible for managing the distribution of mana through the world (via monsters).  He resides in Ginnungagap, and also acts as the guardian of the gate to Niflheim.  Much of the story of the game is centered around him.

The Ratatosk Express is the name given to the train in The Mechanisms' album, 'The Bifrost Incident', which is the setting for the majority of the events in the album.

Ratatoskr is a recurring enemy in the video game La-Mulana 2. He is first found at the roots of the tree of Yggdrasil near Níðhöggr (stylized in-game as Nídhogg) and, later in the game, can be found near Veðrfölnir (stylized in-game as Vedfolnir). He plays a prominent role both in both gameplay and plot, and his appearances culminate into a boss battle which occurs in Hel (location) and opens the pathway to fight Hel (mythological being).

Ratatosk appears in Walter Simonson's Ragnarok comic, which takes place in an alternate mythos in which the forces of evil won the final battle.

Notes

References

 Bellows, Henry Adams (Trans.) (1936). The Poetic Edda. Princeton University Press. New York: The American-Scandinavian Foundation.
 Byock, Jesse (Trans.) (2005). The Prose Edda. Penguin Classics. 
 Davidson, Hilda Roderick Ellis (1993). The Lost Beliefs of Northern Europe. Routledge. 
 Guðbrandur Vigfússon (1874). An Icelandic-English Dictionary: Based on the Ms. Collections of the Late Richard Cleasby. Clarendon Press.
 Lindow, John (2001). Norse Mythology: A Guide to the Gods, Heroes, Rituals, and Beliefs. Oxford University Press. 
 Orchard, Andy (1997). Dictionary of Norse Myth and Legend. Cassell. 
 Simek, Rudolf (2007) translated by Angela Hall. Dictionary of Northern Mythology. D.S. Brewer 
 Sturtevant, Albert Morey (1956). "Three Old Norse Words: Gamban, Ratatoskr, and Gymir" as collected in Sturtevant, Albert Morey (Editor) (1956). Scandinavian Studies''', August 1956, volume 28, number 3.
 Thorington Jr. Richard W. and Ferrell, Katie (2006). Squirrels: The Animal Answer Guide. Johns Hopkins University Press. 
 Thorpe, Benjamin (Trans.) (1907). The Elder Edda of Saemund Sigfusson''. Norrœna Society.

External links 

Creatures in Norse mythology
Mythological rodents
Talking animals in mythology
Squirrels in human culture